Imer Molla Sari (also Romanized as Īmer Mollā Sārī, Eymar Mollā Sārī, and Yamar Mollā Sārī; also known as Eymar) is a village in Bagheli-ye Marama Rural District, in the Central District of Gonbad-e Qabus County, Golestan Province, Iran. At the 2006 census, its population was 2,418, in 546 families.

References 

Populated places in Gonbad-e Kavus County